Maleševci was a historical tribe and a region in Old Herzegovina that existed in the Late Middle Ages.

Origins
The Maleševci are mentioned alongside numerous Montenegrin and Herzegovinian tribes in the 14th and 15th archives from Dubrovnik and Kotor, where they are described as Vlachs organized into a katun. The name Maleševci is the plural of Maleševac, itself derived from the personal name Maleš, the likely founder of the tribe. Apart from the tribe, Maleš is attested in two Vlach katuns from the Prizren estate, in the 14th century. It also gave the patronymic names Malešev and  Malešević, and might be related to the toponym Maleševo, found in several locations in present-day Serbia and Bulgaria.

History

Middle Ages
The earliest known written record referring to the tribe is a Ragusan document, written on January 14, 1374, addressing de Malleseva tribe-clan. They were part of broad offshoot of Vlachs in medieval Bosnia and Herzegovina of katunar Stanko Perutinić (first mentioned 1397) and his brothers and heirs in the end of 14th and beginning of the 15th century. The Maleševci katun developed on the territory of Rudina, Kuta and Korita, and the name Perutinić sometime replaced the name Maleševci, but the latter prevailed.

In 1422 as katunars were recorded Klapac Stanković and Radosav Milićević, later Dubravac Milićević (1428), Stanoje Stanković (1434), Vukac Dubravčić (1461-1468). Stanko Perutinić had three brothers, Milić, Miloš and Hrebeljan, and with their heirs were vassals of Pavlović, while Stanko's heirs of Kosača (Sandalj Hranić, Stjepan Vukčić Kosača) noble family. From 1466 are recorded under Ottoman rule. They like Vlachs from other tribes sometime collaborated with Ottomans as slave agents.

Modern era
The united forces of partisans from Eastern Bosnia and Srem defeated Četniks from Majevica in Maleševci on November 28, 1942, and this event caused the beginning of restoration and domination of The Partisan Movement in Eastern Bosnia.

Families
Many Serbian Orthodox families were members of Maleševci katun. Characteristic for the tribe-clan in Herzegovina is that all families have the Serbian Orthodox slava (patron saint feast day) of St. Ignatius. Family descendants of the Maleševci clan are:

Aleksić
Arsenijević
Balmazović
Bamburač
Bamburać
Banović
Belić
Blagojević
Bogdanović
Bosnić
Božić
Bukara
Cacanović
Čakarević
Čavorović
Čučuković
Ćustić
Dabić
Dakić
Damnjanović
Dedijer
Dizdarević
Dimitrić
Doljančević
Dragić
Dragutinović
Drakul
Drakula
Dubovina
Durić
Đerić
Đokić
Đukić
Đurđević
Đurović
Filipović
Gačić
Gagričić
Gojković
Golić
Gospović
Gruić
Grujičić
Grujić
Ilić
Ivanović
Ivković
Janković
Jaramaz
Jevđić
Jevtić
Jokić
Jovanović
Kalajdžić
Kalem
Klisarić
Knežević
Kočić
Komlenović
Kos
Kovačević
Krecelj
Krnja
Krsmanović
Lalićević
Lazić
Leburić
Lukić
Maćešić
Majdov
Maletić
Mali
Mandić
Marinković
Marjanski
Marković
Matejić
Matić
Miladinović
Milaković
Miličević
Milošević
Milović
Mirjanić
Mirosavljević
Mostić
Nešić
Nikolić
Nović
Njegić
Obradović
Ogrizović
Pantelić
Pantić
Paspalj
Pavlović
Pejić
Pekmezović
Pelkić
Perišić
Petković
Petrić
Petrović
Plotan
Popov
Popović
Radičević
Radivojević
Radonjić
Radosavljević
Radulović
Rakić
Rankov
Ranković
Ristić
Rustić
Savatijević
Simić
Sjeran
Skender
Skorupan
Stanišić
Stanković
Stokrp
Supić
Sušić
Šašo
Šipčić
Šipragić
Škorić
Škrga
Šukurma
Šupić
Tegarić
Terzić
Tešendić
Timotijević
Tiosavljević
Todorović
Treskanica
Tuvedžić
Vakanac
Vasiljević
Vasović
Veletić
Vićentijević
Vidojević
Vignjević
Višić
Vitomir
Vučkovac
Vučković
Vujičić
Vukašnović
Vukić
Vuković
Vukšić
Zarić
Zečević
Živković

People
By ancestry;
Milan Aleksić, Water polo player
Jevto Dedijer, Bosnian Serb anthropologist
Stevan Dedijer, scientist; son of Jevto Dedijer
Vladimir Dedijer, Tito's biographer and historian
Žarko Paspalj, Serbian basketball player
Jovan Maleševac, Serbian Orthodox monk and scribe

See also
Vlachs in medieval Bosnia and Herzegovina
Tribes of Montenegro
Serbs of Bosnia and Herzegovina

References

Sources

 
 
Bačko Aleksandar, Maleševci – rod koji slavi sv. Ignjatija, Zbornik za srpsku etnografiju i istoriju, knj. 1, Udruženje građana „Srpski despot“, Beograd 2007.
Dedijer Jevto, Bilećke Rudine, S. K. A, Srpski etnografski zbornik 5, Naselja srpskih zemalja 2, Beograd 1903, 802 - 806.
Dedijer Jevto, Hercegovina, antropogeografske studije, Biblioteka „Kulturno nasljeđe“, Sarajevo 1991.

Mandić Novak – Studo, Maleševski Mandići, Gacko 2001.
Mandić Novak – Studo, Srpske porodice Vojvodstva svetog Save, Gacko 2000.
Koljanin, D. 2005, "The conflict between Partisans and Četniks in Eastern Bosnia in 1942", Spomenica Istorijskog arhiva Srem, no. 4, pp. 92–130.
Danilović, U. (1985) O vojnim i političkim preduslovima i okolnostima bitke protiv četnika u selu Maleševci 1942. godine. in: Bitka na Meleševcima, 28. XI godine 1942, Tuzla, str. 70-71 
Subotić, V. Velika pobjeda partizana nad četnicima na Maleševcima. in: Istočna Bosna u NOB-u 1941-1945, knj. I, str. 758-758
"Bratstvo Aleksić i istoplemenici `Maleševci` iz stare Rudine u Hercegovini ( 1285 - 2000. ) - Prilog za etnografsku monografiju o Maleševcima", Konstantin - Kosto R. Aleksić, samoizdat u tri kucana primerka, Vrbas, 2000. 
"Istorija Maleša i Maleševaca, sa slikama i pjesmama", Filip Aleksić i Božo Skender, autorsko izdanje, Vrbas, 1966.
"Hercegovina i Hercegovci", Jevto Dedijer, Letopis Matice srpske, knjiga 289, 1912. 
"Stare seoske porodice u Hercegovini", Dr Jevto Dedijer, Glasnik zemaljskog muzeja u Bosni i Hercegovini XIX, Sarajevo, 1907. 

 
Medieval Herzegovina
Vlachs in the history of Bosnia and Herzegovina
Tribes of Montenegro
Serbs of Bosnia and Herzegovina